The Fern Rock Transportation Center  is a SEPTA rail and bus station located at 10th Street and Nedro Avenue in the Fern Rock neighborhood of Philadelphia, Pennsylvania. Fern Rock serves as the northern terminus and yard for SEPTA's Broad Street Line, as well as a stop for SEPTA Regional Rail's Lansdale/Doylestown Line, Warminster Line, and West Trenton Line.

Four bus routes also serve the station.  Fern Rock Transportation Center serves as the western terminus for the 28 and 70 bus routes. Fern Rock is also the northernmost terminus for the 4 and 57 bus routes.

Regional Rail platforms
Fern Rock Transportation Center serves the Warminster Line, West Trenton Line, and the Lansdale/Doylestown Line. In FY 2015, there was a weekday average of 825 boardings and 792 alightings.

The current SEPTA Regional Rail station at Fern Rock Transportation Center, located along the SEPTA Main Line, was built in March 1992 to accommodate Regional Rail commuters displaced during SEPTA's 1992/1993 Railworks reconstruction project. The new station replaced former Reading Railroad stations Fern Rock and Tabor, respectively located north and south of the new station. It has high-level platforms and is handicap-accessible, being directly connected to the subway station by a ramp from the subway platform. While passengers can readily transfer between the Broad Street Line and the Regional Rail Lines at Fern Rock, such a transfer requires payment of a separate fare of the subway and regional rail, unless the rider possesses a SEPTA Trailpass, which can be used for travel on both subway and regional rail. A non-revenue track connection exists here between the SEPTA Regional Rail Lines and SEPTA's Broad Street Line. A train crash occurred here on January 27, 2009, injuring nine.

Broad Street platform
The Broad Street platforms at Fern Rock Transportation Center opened in 1956, when the line was extended north from the original northern terminus at Olney Terminal by the Philadelphia Transportation Company (PTC) and the City of Philadelphia.  Fern Rock Transportation Center also hosts the yard and maintenance facilities for the Broad Street Line, and is the line's only above ground station.

Fern Rock is the northern terminal for local and express trains on the line, as well as the special event service that extends express service to the South Philadelphia Sports Complex. Broad–Ridge Spur trains generally only serve the station on Saturdays and during non-peak weekday hours.

Station layout
All tracks are located at ground level, with Regional Rail platforms oriented north-south and the Broad Street platform oriented east-west, part of a larger balloon loop around the storage yard.

Image gallery

References

External links

 Nedro Avenue entrance from Google Maps Street View

SEPTA Regional Rail stations
SEPTA Broad Street Line stations
Stations on the SEPTA Main Line
Railway stations in the United States opened in 1956
SEPTA stations and terminals
Railway stations in Philadelphia
Olney-Oak Lane, Philadelphia
Railways with Zig Zags